Krok or KROK or variant thereof, may refer to:

People
 Duke Krok, the father of Libuše in Czech legend 
 Matthew Krok (b. 1983), Australian child actor
 Morris Krok (1931–2005), South African writer

Other uses
 Krok, Wisconsin, an unincorporated community in the United States
 KROK (FM), a radio station (95.7 FM) licensed to South Fort Polk, Louisiana, United States
 KROK International Animated Films Festival, a Russian / Ukrainian film festival
 3102 Krok, an asteroid

See also
 
 KROC (disambiguation)
 Kroc (surname)
 Krock (disambiguation)
 KROQ-FM, radio station in Greater Los Angeles, California, USA